Jim Manzi (born 1951) is the former chairman, president and CEO of Lotus Development Corporation and is currently a private investor in various technology start-up ventures.

Early career
Manzi received his B.A. in Classics from Colgate University in 1973, and later received his M.A. in International Relations from the Fletcher School of Law and Diplomacy at Tufts University in Medford, Massachusetts.  In 1973, Manzi was a research assistant to William F. Buckley, and journeyed to the Soviet Union with the editorial staff of National Review. Later, Manzi worked as a management consultant at McKinsey & Company.

Lotus
In 1982, Manzi joined Lotus Development.  In 1984, he became President and two years later Chairman and CEO succeeding founder Mitchell Kapor. When Kapor left the company, Manzi steered the company away from desktop application software. He is credited with successfully migrating the company to and creating a new category of network applications. The product, Lotus Notes, was developed by Ray Ozzie and a team of engineers at Iris Associates, in conjunction with a core team at Lotus. Ultimately the company was sold for a $3.5 billion to IBM. largely on the strength of the potential of Lotus Notes.  On October 11, 1995 Manzi announced his resignation from the Lotus division of IBM.

Career after Lotus
Since 1995, via his investment company Stonegate Capital, Manzi has been involved in the creation and development of a number of technology start-up ventures.

On May 25, 2000, Manzi made an investment in Interwise and joined its board. Interwise was sold to AT&T.  He is on the boards of Cargometrics, Elysium Health and Paxos.. For 12 years until 2020, he was chairman of Thermo Fisher Scientific  a public company in life sciences technology and services with $40 billion in sales and a market cap of more than $200 billion.

Personal life
Manzi is married to Kay Calvert, a retired technology executive. From a prior marriage, Manzi has three children, Julianna, 32, Jay 31 and Jack, 25.

References

Notes

 Darrow, Barbara. 2003 Industry Hall of Fame: Jim Manzi.  CRN, December 15, 2003
 Judge, Paul C. and Baker, Stephen. Were Jim Manzi's Big Ideas Too Big?.  BusinessWeek, May 26, 1997
 Former Lotus Chief Manzi Heads Up Another Venture.  TechWeb.com, December 09, 2003

External links
 Jim Manzi's Article (The End of the Literary Industrial Complex)
 2003 Industry Hall of Fame: Jim Manzi
 Were Jim Manzi's Big Ideas Too Big?
 Manzi Resigns At Lotus
 InterWise Appoints Former Lotus Chief, Jim Manzi, to Board of Directors
 One-stop site for blogs offered - The Boston Globe
 Willamette University - Jim Manzi
 Chief of I.B.M.'s Lotus Resigns 99 days After Takeover Deal (From the October 12, 1995 New York Times)

1951 births
Colgate University alumni
Living people
American people of Italian descent
American management consultants
McKinsey & Company people
People from Cotuit, Massachusetts